The 2023 Haifa mayoral election will be held in October 2023 to elect the mayor of Haifa.

Background 
Haifa is led by Einat Kalisch-Rotem, who was first elected in 2018, defeating incumbent Yona Yahav.

In July of 2021, several parties in the City Council formed the Change Council, an informal coalition of parties opposing Kalisch-Rotem, which holds a majority on the City Council. Later that month, two of Kalisch-Rotem's deputy mayors were removed from office by the City Council, and replaced by Change Council members in August.

Candidates

Declared 

 David Etzioni - Lawyer.
 Israel Savyon - Former Deputy Mayor of Haifa.
 Ya'akov Borkovski - Former City Councillor and candidate for Mayor in 2008 and 2013.

Expressed Interest 

 Yona Yahav - Mayor of Haifa (2003-2018), Member of the Knesset (1996-1999).
 Naama Lazimi - Member of the Knesset (2021-).

References 

2023 elections in Israel
Mayoral elections in Haifa